The 2007 Detroit Indy Grand Prix presented by Firestone was an IndyCar Series race that was held on September 2, 2007 on the Raceway on Belle Isle in Detroit, Michigan. It was the sixteenth race of the 2007 IndyCar Series season. Originally scheduled to run over 90 laps, it was shortened to 89 laps. The race was won by Tony Kanaan for the Andretti Green Racing team. Danica Patrick finished second, and Dan Wheldon clinched third.

Hélio Castroneves claimed pole position for the race, and led the race for the first 26 laps. Dario Franchitti look over the lead when Castroneves pitted, and maintained it until lap 49 when he pitted and relinquished the position to Buddy Rice. Rice held the lead for seven laps, before it passed to Patrick, and then back to Franchitti. Kanaan took the lead on lap 70, staying on the track while most of the field pitted after a caution, and remained at the front for the rest of the race. Behind him, Rice was running in second position, but on the penultimate lap of the race, he ran out of fuel and slowed suddenly, causing Scott Dixon to collide with him, and spin the pair into the barriers. Franchitti, who had been just behind the pair, was blocked by the two cars, but kept running and finished in sixth.

There were six full course cautions, totaling 19 laps during the race, as a result of which the race was completed in 89 laps, hitting the time limit of 2 hours and 10 minutes, rather than the scheduled 90 laps. It was Kanaan's fifth victory of the 2007 season. Of the 18 drivers that started, 9 were listed as running at the end of the race; six retired after contact, and three retired with mechanical issues.

Classification

Qualifying

Race results

Standings after the race
Drivers' Championship

References 

Detroit Indy Grand Prix
Detroit Indy Grand Prix
Detroit Indy Grand Prix
Detroit Indy Grand Prix
2007 in Detroit